Planica 1953 was an International ski jumping week with international competition on Srednja Bloudkova K80 hill, held on 8 March 1953 in Planica, PR Slovenia, FPR Yugoslavia. Over 11,000 people has gathered.

Cockta, the most famous Slovenian soft drink, was introduced to the public for the very first time in Planica, advertised on huge billboards as main sponsor and became instant hit.

Schedule

Competitions
On 6 March 1953, first training with three rounds in front of around 1,000 spectators was on schedule. Bine Rogelj was the longest with 85 metres.

On 7 March 1953, second training with four rounds was on schedule. Rudi Finžgar was the longest with 78 metres.

On 8 March 1953, international competition with 38 competitors from Yugoslavia, Austria, France, West Germany, Switzerland and Italy on K80 normal hill was on schedule. Hermann Anwander won.

Training 1 
6 March 1953 – Four rounds – incomplete

Training 2
7 March 1953 – Four rounds – incomplete

 Fall or touch!

International competition 

8 March 1953 — Two rounds — official results

References

1953 in Yugoslav sport
1953 in ski jumping
1953 in Slovenia
Ski jumping competitions in Yugoslavia
International sports competitions hosted by Yugoslavia
Ski jumping competitions in Slovenia
International sports competitions hosted by Slovenia